Lem is a settlement located in the north of the island Brava, Cape Verde, just 1 km north of the island capital Nova Sintra. Its population in 2010 was 282.

References

Villages and settlements in Brava, Cape Verde